The Separating Bridge (German: Die trennende Brücke) is a 1922 Austrian silent film directed by Julius Herska and starring Maria Mindzenty, Nora Gregor and Eugen Jensen.

Cast
 Maria Mindzenty
 Nora Gregor
 Eugen Jensen
 Josef Becker
 Emil Bittner
 Viktor Flemmig
 Julius Klinkowström
 Maria Ley
 Charlotte Pohl
 Marietta Weber
 Theodor Weiß

References

Bibliography
 Elisabeth Büttner & Christian Dewald. Das tägliche Brennen: eine Geschichte des österreichischen Films von den Anfängen bis 1945, Volume 1. Residenz, 2002.

External links

1922 films
Austrian silent feature films
Films directed by Julius Herska
Austrian black-and-white films